This article contains links to lists of lighthouses around the world. According to Lighthouse Directory, there are more than 18,600 lighthouses worldwide.

Africa
Note: Click on the country or place name of your choice in the table below to link you to lighthouses in that area.

Antarctica
 List of lighthouses in Antarctica
 List of lighthouses in the French Southern and Antarctic Lands

Asia

Note: Click on the country or place name of your choice in the table below to link you to lighthouses in that area.

Europe

Note: Click on the country or place name of your choice in the table below to link you to lighthouses in that area.

North America
Note: Click on the country or place name of your choice in the table below to link you to lighthouses in that area.

Oceania
Note: Click on the country or place name of your choice in the table below to link you to lighthouses in that area.

South America
Note: Click on the country or place name of your choice in the table below to link you to lighthouses in that area.

See also
 List of tallest lighthouses in the world
 List of buildings
 Lists of lightvessels
 Amateur Radio Lighthouse Society

References